The following highways are numbered 938:

Ireland
 R938 regional road

Costa Rica
 National Route 938

United States